The 1973 Baltimore Orioles season was a season in American baseball. It involved the Orioles finishing first in the American League East with a record of 97 wins and 65 losses. They went on to lose to the Oakland Athletics in the 1973 American League Championship Series, three games to two.

Offseason 
 October 27, 1972: Frank Estrada was traded by the Orioles to the Chicago Cubs for Elrod Hendricks.
 November 30, 1972: Johnny Oates, Pat Dobson, Roric Harrison, and Davey Johnson were traded by the Orioles to the Atlanta Braves for Earl Williams and Taylor Duncan.
 January 10, 1973: John Flinn was drafted by the Orioles in the 2nd round of the 1973 Major League Baseball Draft, secondary phase.
 February 2, 1973: Don Buford was released by the Orioles.

Regular season

Season standings

Record vs. opponents

Notable transactions 
 April 5, 1973: Tom Matchick was traded by the Orioles to the New York Yankees for Frank Baker.
 June 5, 1973: Mike Flanagan was drafted by the Orioles in the 7th round of the 1973 Major League Baseball Draft.
 July 18, 1973: Curt Motton was signed as a free agent by the Orioles.

Roster

Player stats

Batting

Starters by position 
Note: Pos = Position; G = Games played; AB = At bats; H = Hits; Avg. = Batting average; HR = Home runs; RBI = Runs batted in

Other batters 
Note: G = Games played; AB = At bats; H = Hits; Avg. = Batting average; HR = Home runs; RBI = Runs batted in

Pitching

Starting pitchers 
Note: G = Games pitched; IP = Innings pitched; W = Wins; L = Losses; ERA = Earned run average; SO = Strikeouts

Other pitchers 
Note: G = Games pitched; IP = Innings pitched; W = Wins; L = Losses; ERA = Earned run average; SO = Strikeouts

Relief pitchers 
Note: G = Games pitched; W = Wins; L = Losses; SV = Saves; ERA = Earned run average; SO = Strikeouts

Postseason

ALCS

Game 1 
October 6, 1973, at Memorial Stadium

Game 2 
October 7, 1973, at Memorial Stadium

Game 3 
October 9, 1973, at Oakland Coliseum

Game 4 
October 10, 1973, at Oakland Coliseum

Game 5 
October 11, 1973, at Oakland Coliseum

Farm system 

LEAGUE CHAMPIONS: Lodi

Notes

References 

1973 Baltimore Orioles team page at Baseball Reference
1973 Baltimore Orioles season at baseball-almanac.com

Baltimore Orioles seasons
Baltimore Orioles season
American League East champion seasons
Baltimore Orioles